In the Battle of Cape Finisterre (22 July 1805) off Galicia, Spain, the British fleet under Admiral Robert Calder fought an indecisive naval battle against the combined Franco-Spanish fleet which was returning from the West Indies. Failing to prevent the joining of French Admiral Pierre de Villeneuve's fleet to the squadron of Ferrol and to strike the shattering blow that would have freed Great Britain from the danger of an invasion, Calder was later court-martialled and severely reprimanded for his failure and for avoiding the renewal of the engagement on 23 and 24 July. At the same time, in the aftermath Villeneuve elected not to continue on to Brest, where his fleet could have joined with other French ships to clear the English Channel for an invasion of Great Britain.

Strategic background 

The fragile Peace of Amiens of 1802 had come to an end when Napoleon formally annexed the Italian state of Piedmont and on 18 May 1803 Britain was once again at war with France.

Napoleon planned to end the British blockade by invading and conquering Britain. By 1805 his Armée d'Angleterre was 150,000 strong and encamped at Boulogne. If this army could cross the English Channel, victory over the poorly trained and equipped militias was very likely. The plan was that the French navy would escape from the British blockades of Toulon and Brest and threaten to attack the West Indies, thus drawing off the British defence of the Western Approaches. The combined fleets would rendezvous at Martinique and then double back to Europe, land troops in Ireland to raise a rebellion, defeat the weakened British patrols in the Channel, and help transport the Armée d'Angleterre across the Straits of Dover.

Villeneuve sailed from Toulon on 29 March with eleven ships of the line, six frigates and two brigs. He evaded Admiral Nelson's blockading fleet and passed the Strait of Gibraltar on 8 April. At Cádiz, he drove off the British blockading squadron and was joined by six Spanish ships of the line. The combined fleet sailed for the West Indies, reaching Martinique on 12 May.

Nelson was kept in the Mediterranean by westerly winds and did not pass the Strait until 7 May. The British fleet of ten ships reached Antigua on 4 June.

Villeneuve waited at Martinique for Admiral Ganteaume's Brest fleet to join him, but it remained blockaded in port. Pleas from French army officers for Villeneuve to attack British colonies went unheeded — except for the recapture of the island fort of Diamond Rock — until 4 June when he set out from Martinique. On 7 June he learned from a captured British merchantman that Nelson had arrived at Antigua, and on 11 June Villeneuve left for Europe, having failed to achieve any of his objectives in the Caribbean.

While in the Antilles, the Franco-Spanish fleet ran into a British convoy worth 5 million francs escorted by the frigate Barbadoes, 28 guns, and sloop Netley. Villeneuve hoisted general chase and two French frigates with the Spanish ship Argonauta, 80 guns, captured all the ships but one escort.

On 30 June the combined squadron captured and burned an English 14-gun privateer. On 3 July the fleet recaptured Spanish galleon Matilda, which carried an estimated 15 million franc treasure, from English privateer Mars, from Liverpool, which was towing Matilda to an English harbour.

The fleet sailed back to Europe. On 9 July the French ship Indomptable lost its main spar in a gale that damaged some other vessels slightly. The Atlantic crossings had been very difficult, according to Spanish Admiral Gravina, who had crossed the Atlantic eleven times. So, with some ships in bad condition, tired crews and scarce victuals, the combined fleet sighted land near Cape Finisterre on 22 July.

Battle 

News of the returning French fleet reached Vice Admiral Robert Calder on 19 July. He was ordered to lift his blockade of the ports of Rochefort and Ferrol and sail for Cape Finisterre to intercept Villeneuve. The fleets sighted each other at about 11:00 on 22 July.

After several hours of manoeuvring to the south-west, the action began at about 17:15 as the British fleet, with Hero (Captain Alan Gardner) in the vanguard, bore down on the Franco-Spanish line of battle. In poor visibility, the battle became a confused melee. Malta formed the rear-most ship in the British line in the approach to the battle, but as the fleets became confused in the failing light and thick patchy fog, Malta, commanded by Sir Edward Buller, found itself surrounded by five Spanish ships. After a fierce engagement in which Malta suffered five killed and forty wounded, the British ship battled it out, sending out devastating broadsides from both port and starboard. At about 20:00, Buller forced the Spanish 80-gun San Rafael to strike, and afterwards sent the Maltas boats to take possession of the Spanish 74-gun Firme. Calder signalled to break-off the action at 20:25, aiming to continue the battle the next day. In the failing light and general confusion, some ships continued to fire for another hour.

Calder was unwilling to attack a second time against superior odds. He had to protect the damaged Windsor Castle and Malta with her large captured Spanish prizes and considered the possibility that the previously blockaded fleets at Rochefort and Ferrol might put to sea and effect a junction with Villeneuve's combined fleet. Accordingly, he declined to attack and headed northeast with his prizes.

Villeneuve's report claims that at first he intended to attack, but in the very light breezes it took all day to come up to the British and he decided not to risk combat late in the day. On 24 July a change in the wind put the Franco-Spanish fleet to the windward of the British — the ideal position for an attack — but instead of attacking, Villeneuve turned away to the south. When he arrived at A Coruña on 1 August, he received orders from Napoleon to proceed immediately to Brest and Boulogne, but perhaps believing a false report of a superior British fleet in the Bay of Biscay, he returned to Cádiz, arriving on 21 August.

Aftermath 
The battle was inconclusive and both admirals, Villeneuve and Calder, claimed victory. The British human losses were 39 officers and men killed and 159 wounded; the Franco-Spanish losses 476 officers and men killed and wounded, with a further 800 ill. Calder was relieved of his command, court-martialled, and sentenced to be severely reprimanded for his failure to renew the battle on 23 and 24 July.  He never served at sea again. Villeneuve failed to push on Brest, retired to refit at Vigo, then slipped into Coruña, and on 15 August decided to make for Cadiz.
The direction of Villeneuve on Cadiz ruined all hopes of Napoleon to make an invasion and landing in England, thus Napoleon, frustrated by Villeneuve's lack of élan, was forced to abandon his plan of invading Britain. Instead, the Armée d'Angleterre, renamed the Grande Armée, left Boulogne on 27 August to counter the threat from Austria and Russia. A few weeks after the battle he wrote: "Gravina is all genius and decision in combat. If Villeneuve had had those qualities, the battle of Finisterre would have been a complete victory."

Villeneuve and the combined fleets remained at Cádiz until they came out to their destruction at the Battle of Trafalgar on 21 October.

Order of battle

British fleet
 Calder had fifteen ships of the line (and ), two frigates ( and ), and two smaller vessels.

Franco-Spanish fleet

(according to Juan Ramón Viana Villavicencio)

See also 
 Ferrol Spanish Capital of the Maritime Department of the North (1788 AD).

Notes

References 
 Bennett, G. The Battle of Trafalgar, Barnsley (2004). 
 Arthur Brytant, Years of Victory 1802 - 1812 Harper & Brothers, London (1945).
 London Literary Gazette and Journal of Belles Lettres, Arts, Sciences, &c. 473. London, (1823).
 Barnes Fremont Gregory, The Royal Navy 1793 - 1815, Osprey Publishing (2007). .
 Barnes Fremont Gregory, Trafalgar 1805, Nelson's crowning victory, Osprey Publishing (2005). 
 Marriott, J. A. R, The evolution of modern Europe part III 1789-1932
 W. Moors, Arthur. A history of England 1689-1837, Harvard College Library, New York.
 Thayer Mahan Alfred, The Life of Nelson Vol 2;The Embodiment of the Sea Power of Great Britain BiblioBazaar Publishing, (2002). 
 Myrick Broadley Alexander, Napoleon And The Invasion of England - The Story of The Great Terror, Read Country Books Publishing. 
 Palmer, Michael A. Command at sea: naval command and control since the sixteenth century, Harvard University Press. 
 Stewart, William. Admirals of the World: A Biographical Dictionary, 1500 to the Present McFarland & Co Inc, 2009. 
 Tucker, Spencer, A Global Chronology of Conflict: From the Ancient World to the Modern Middle East ABC-CLIO 2007. 
 Weigley, Russell. The Age of Battles: The Quest For Decisive Warfare from Breitenfeld to Waterloo. Indiana University Press. 1991 
 William James, Naval History of Great Britain, 1793–1827.

External links
 
 Spanish Capital of the Maritime Department of the North (1788 AD).
 Battle of Cape Finisterre: 'Military History Encyclopedia on the Web.
 Vessels Blockading various French and Spanish ports - May 1805.
 Index of British Vessels - May 1805.
 The Naval Station of Ferrol in pictures - 2004.
 Todo a Babor. La Batalla de Finisterre The battle of Finisterre. In Spanish.

Naval battles of the Napoleonic Wars
Naval battles involving Spain
Naval battles involving France
Naval battles involving the United Kingdom
Conflicts in 1805
Napoleon's planned invasion of the United Kingdom
1805 in France
War of the Third Coalition
Battles of the War of the Third Coalition
Battles in Galicia (Spain)
19th-century history of the Royal Navy
July 1805 events